Evergestis mimounalis is a species of moth in the family Crambidae. It is found in the Middle Atlas and High Atlas mountains in Morocco.

The wingspan is about 30 mm. The ground colour of the forewings is white with dark brown suffusion at the base in the middle and at the margin. The hindwings are whitish dark brown. Adults have been recorded on wing from July to September.

References

Moths described in 1922
Evergestis
Moths of Africa